Frank Gomez (born March 31, 1986) is an American mixed martial artist. He formally fought in the WEC's bantamweight division. Gomez is from Albuquerque, New Mexico where he trains full-time with Jackson's Submission Fighting. He got into MMA from wrestling at San Francisco State College where he met up with Gilbert Melendez and Jake Shields.

Mixed martial arts career

World Extreme Cagefighting 
Gomez faced Scott Jorgensen at WEC 38 on January 25, 2009. He lost the fight via guillotine choke, giving him the first loss of his career.  Gomez then defeated Seth Dikun on November 18, 2009 at WEC 44.

Gomez was expected to face Wagnney Fabiano on January 10, 2010 at WEC 46, but was forced off the card with an injury.  Gomez was replaced by WEC newcomer Clint Godfrey.

Fabiano/Gomez eventually took place on June 20, 2010 at WEC 49. Gomez lost the fight via unanimous decision.

Post-WEC career
Following his release from WEC, Gomez debuted in the Shark Fights promotion, facing Timothy Snyder at Shark Fights 15: Villaseñor vs Camozzi on May 27, 2011. He won the fight via rear-naked choke.

Mixed martial arts record

|-
| Loss
| align=center| 10–6
| Aaron Cerda
| TKO (eye injury)
| JMMAS 9
| 
| align=center| 1
| align=center| 4:26
| Albuquerque, New Mexico, United States
| 
|-
| Loss
| align=center| 10–5
| Chris Gruetzemacher
| TKO (punches)
| WMMA 1 
| 
| align=center| 1
| align=center| 3:25
| El Paso, Texas, United States
| 
|-
| Loss
| align=center| 10–4
| Daniel Pineda
| Submission (rear-naked choke) 
| Legacy FC 7: Prater vs. Dollar
| 
| align=center| 3
| align=center| 2:55
| Houston, Texas, United States
| 
|-
| Win
| align=center| 10–3
| Timothy Snyder
| Submission (rear-naked choke) 
| Shark Fights 15: Villaseñor vs Camozzi
| 
| align=center| 1
| align=center| 3:19
| Rio Rancho, New Mexico, United States
| 
|-
| Win
| align=center| 9–3
| Alfredo Herrea
| TKO (punches)
| Mescalero Warrior Challenge
| 
| align=center| 1
| align=center| 1:45
| Mescalero, New Mexico, United States
| 
|-
| Loss
| align=center| 8–3
| Johnny Bedford
| Submission (rear-naked choke) 
| Jackson's MMA Series 3
| 
| align=center| 1
| align=center| 1:34
| Albuquerque, New Mexico, United States
| 
|-
| Loss
| align=center| 8–2
| Wagnney Fabiano
| Decision (unanimous) 
| WEC 49
| 
| align=center| 3
| align=center| 5:00
| Edmonton, Alberta, Canada
| 
|-
| Win
| align=center| 8–1
| Seth Dikun
| Decision (unanimous) 
| WEC 44
| 
| align=center| 3
| align=center| 5:00
| Las Vegas, Nevada, United States
| 
|-
| Win
| align=center| 7–1
| Noah Thomas
| Submission (arm triangle choke)
| WEC 41
| 
| align=center| 2
| align=center| 3:12
| Sacramento, California, United States
| 
|-
| Loss
| align=center| 6–1
| Scott Jorgensen
| Submission (guillotine choke)
| WEC 38
| 
| align=center| 1
| align=center| 1:09
| San Diego, California, United States
| 
|-
| Win
| align=center| 6–0
| Matt Ott
| TKO (punches)
| WP - Warpath
| 
| align=center| 1
| align=center| 1:42
| Albuquerque, New Mexico, United States
| 
|-
| Win
| align=center| 5–0
| Eddie Armendariz
| TKO
| SCA - Duke City Brawl 2
| 
| align=center| 1
| 
| New Mexico, United States
| 
|-
| Win
| align=center| 4–0
| Andy Miranda
| Submission (rear naked choke)
| CCFC - Total Elimination
| 
| align=center| 2
| 
| Santa Rosa, California, United States
| 
|-
| Win
| align=center| 3–0
| Brandon Jinnies
| Decision
| GKO 2 - Global Knockout 2
| 
| align=center| 3
| align=center| 5:00
| Jackson, California, United States
| 
|-
| Win
| align=center| 2–0
| Chris Duenas
| TKO (punches)
| PXC 10 - Final Redemption
| 
| align=center| 1
| 
| Mangilao, Guam
| 
|-
| Win
| align=center| 1–0
| Elbert Randle
| TKO
| GKO 1 - Global Knockout 1
| 
| align=center| 2
| 
| Jackson, California, United States
|

References

External links 

American male mixed martial artists
Mixed martial artists from Nevada
Bantamweight mixed martial artists
Living people
1986 births